Antonina Zetova (Bulgarian: Антонина Зетова) (born on 7 September 1973 in Pleven) is an international volleyball player from Bulgaria.

Career 
As a left handed outside hitter 1.89 m tall Zetova lead the Bulgarian team to several successes, including a bronze medal at the European Championship in 2001, where she was awarded best scorer.

In the Italian league, where she played since 1998, Zetova won all possible national titles at least one time and European titles namely Top Teams Cup in 2005 with Chieri and the most important European Champions League title with Despar Perugia in 2006.
She was elected best foreign player, All-Star and Best Spiker of the Italian league.

In 2008/09 she played for Palma Volley in Spain after giving birth to her son becoming vice champion and 2nd best player after Priscilla Rivera.

Zetova came back to her former clubs in Italy, Perugia and Chieri, in 2009 where she retired in 2012.

She is currently employed as an assistant coach of CSKA Sofia's women volleyball team.

Zetova is the current coach of Bulgaria U-23 women team.

Clubs
  VC CSKA Sofia (1989–1995)
  Eczacibasi Istanbul (1995–1997)
  VakifBank Istanbul (1997–1998)
  Omnitel Modena (1998–1999)
  Phone Limited Modena (1999–2000)
  Radio 105 Foppapedretti Bergamo (2000–2001)
  Edison Modena (2001–2002)
  Eczacibasi Istanbul (2002–2003)
  Pallavolo Chieri (2003–2004)
  Bigmat Kerakoll Chieri (2004–2005)
  Despar Perugia (2005–2007)
  Palma Volley (2008–2009)
  Olympiacos (2008–2009)
  Despar Perugia (2009–2010)
  Famila Generali Chieri (2010–2012)

Awards

Individuals
 1999/2000 Italian League "Best Scorer"
 2000/2001 Italian League "Best Scorer"
 2006/2007 Italian League "All-Star"

Clubs
 1990-91 Bulgarian Championship - Champion, with CSKA Sofia
 1991-92 Bulgarian Championship - Champion, with CSKA Sofia
 1992-93 Bulgarian Cup - Champion, with CSKA Sofia
 1992-93 Bulgarian Championship - Champion, with CSKA Sofia
 1994-95 Bulgarian Cup - Champion, with CSKA Sofia
 1994-95 Bulgarian Championship - Champion, with CSKA Sofia
 1997 Turkish Cup - Champion, with Eczacibasi Istanbul
 1997 Turkish Championship -  Champion, with Eczacibasi Istanbul
 1998 Turkish Cup - Champion, with Eczacibasi Istanbul
 1998 Turkish Championship -  Champion, with Eczacibasi Istanbul
 2000 Italian Championship - Champion, with Phone Limited Modena
 2001-02 CEV Cup - Champion, with Edison Modena
 2002 Italian Cup - Champion, with Edison Modena
 2003 Turkish Cup - Champion, with Eczacibasi Istanbul
 2003 Turkish Championship -  Champion, with Eczacibasi Istanbul
 2004-05 Top Teams Cup - Champion, with Pallavolo Chieri
 2006 Italian League Cup - Champion, with Despar Perugia
 2005–06 CEV Indesit Champions League - Champion, with Sirio Perugia
 2007 Italian Cup - Champion, with Despar Perugia
 2007 Italian Championship - Champion, with Despar Perugia
 2006-07 CEV Cup - Champion, with Despar Perugia

National Team
 2001 European Championship - Bronze Medal
 2010 European League - Silver Medal

References

External links
 
 

Bulgarian women's volleyball players
1973 births
Living people
Expatriate volleyball players in Spain
Olympiacos Women's Volleyball players
Eczacıbaşı volleyball players
Bulgarian expatriate sportspeople in Italy
Bulgarian expatriate sportspeople in Spain
Bulgarian expatriate sportspeople in Turkey
Sportspeople from Pleven
Opposite hitters
Bulgarian expatriates in Greece
Expatriate volleyball players in Turkey
Expatriate volleyball players in Italy
Expatriate volleyball players in Greece